Marina del Rey (Spanish for "Marina of the King") is an unincorporated seaside community in Los Angeles County, California, with an eponymous harbor that is a major boating and water recreation destination of the greater Los Angeles area. The port is North America's largest man-made small-craft harbor and is home to approximately 5,000 boats. The area is a popular tourism destination for both land and water activities such as paddle board and kayak rentals, dining cruises, and yacht charters. Land activities include bicycling on several bicycle paths, walking paths along the waterfront, and birdwatching (birding). Wildlife watching opportunities include California sea lions and harbor seals. Dolphins and whales occasionally visit the deeper waters of harbor.

The harbor is owned by Los Angeles County and managed by the Department of Beaches and Harbors (DBH), but the waters are environmentally regulated by state government and federal government through their many agencies and departments with overlapping oversight. The Los Angeles Times said in a 1997 editorial that the harbor is "perhaps the county's most valuable resource". The population was 11,373 at the 2020 census. For statistical purposes, the United States Census Bureau has defined Marina del Rey as a census-designated place (CDP). The census definition of the area may not precisely correspond to local understanding of the area with the same name; for example, the 90292 ZIP code includes all of Marina del Rey and portions of neighboring Los Angeles, such as Del Rey, and has a population of 21,576, more than double that of the CDP. Many residents of the 90292 ZIP code consider themselves to live in Marina del Rey even if they in fact live outside the official boundaries of the CDP.

History

Prior to its development as a small-craft harbor, the land occupied by Marina del Rey was a salt marsh fed by fresh water from Ballona Creek. The area was frequented by the Tongva, who used plank boats known as te'aats to traverse the waters and paddle out to the Channel Islands. Fishing and shellfish harvesting were common. The village of Guashna was a major regional trade center between villages on the islands and the mainland.

With the increasing arrival of European settlers, in the mid-19th century, Moye C. Wicks thought of turning this estuary and wetland of Playa del Rey into a commercial port. He formed the Ballona Development Company in 1888 to develop the area, but three years later the company went bankrupt. The area became frequented by duck hunters, including their hunting club, as well as by birdwatchers of the Los Angeles Audubon Society and the southern chapter of the Cooper Ornithological Club. Burton W. Chace, a former councilman of the City of Long Beach, who later became a member of the Los Angeles County Board of Supervisors, referred to the area as mud flats, though today the area would more properly be referred to as an estuary and wetland.

Port Ballona made by Louis Mesmer and Moye Wicks was then sold to Moses Sherman. Sherman purchased  of land around the Ballona lagoon and Port Ballona in 1902 under the name the Beach Land Company. Sherman and Clark renamed the land "Del Rey". Port Ballona was then renamed Playa Del Rey. The port was serviced by the California Central Railway opened in September 1887, this line later became the Santa Fe Railway, that later became the Atchison, Topeka, and Santa Fe Railroad. The rail line ran from the port to Redondo junction. A street car tram line was made to the Port by the Redondo and Hermosa Beach Railroad company, that had incorporated on February 21, 1901. This company was part of the Los Angeles Pacific Railroad owned by Sherman. The tram line opened December 1902 departed downtown at 4th & Broadway.

In 1916, the U.S. Army Corps of Engineers revisited the idea of a commercial harbor, but declared it economically impractical. In 1936 the U.S. Congress ordered a re-evaluation of that determination, and the Army Corps of Engineers returned with a more favorable determination; however, the Marina del Rey harbor concept lost out to San Pedro as a commercial harbor and development funding went to the Port of Los Angeles instead.

In 1949, the Army Corps of Engineers submitted an elaborate $23 million plan for a marina with mooring space for over 8,000 small-craft boats. In 1954, President Eisenhower signed Public Law 83-780, authorizing the study of the creation of the Marina as a federal project. After seven years of legislative wrangling, Public Law 87-402 renamed the Playa Del Rey Inlet and Harbor as Marina Del Rey, implicitly enshrining the authorization of the project into law. 

Ground breaking began shortly after, during the early years of the John F. Kennedy administration.

With construction almost complete, the marina was put in danger in 1962–1963 due to a winter storm. The storm caused millions of dollars in damage to both the marina and the few small boats anchored there. A plan was put into effect to build a breakwater at the mouth of the marina, and the L.A. County Board of Supervisors appropriated $2.1 million to build it. On April 10, 1965, Marina del Rey was formally dedicated. The total cost of the marina was $36.25 million for land, construction, and initial operation.

Los Angeles County then solicited bids for the harbor and port development, selling 60 year leaseholds to willing developers. Real estate developer Abraham M. Lurie was the single largest leaseholder responsible for the building of three hotels, two apartment complexes, 1,000 boat slips, and several shopping centers, offices, restaurants; his holdings also included the last undeveloped piece of waterfront land in Marina del Rey. He eventually ran into cash flow problems and sold a 49.9% interest to Saudi Arabian Sheik Abdul Aziz al Ibrahim, a brother of Waleed bin Ibrahim Al Ibrahim and a brother-in-law of King Fahd; the investment soon turned sour and following a protracted and aggressive lawsuit, in 1993 Lurie lost his entire interest in the development to Abdul Aziz.

Geography
Marina del Rey falls within unincorporated Los Angeles County and is southeast of Venice and north of Playa del Rey, near the mouth of Ballona Creek. The harbor and port is located four miles (6 km) north of Los Angeles International Airport.

The harbor and the unincorporated residential and business community of Marina del Rey is bounded on all sides by the city of Los Angeles. The beach-style homes, on the inner portion of the coastal strand and the beach (see photo), west of the harbor, are within the city limits of Los Angeles, but share the same zip code as Marina del Rey. The name of this coastal strand that surrounds an estuarine inlet known as the Ballona Lagoon Marine Preserve is called the Marina Peninsula. The city street, Via Dolce, forms the boundary between Los Angeles and the unincorporated area of Los Angeles County, known as Marina del Rey.

One of the highest and tallest buildings in Marina del Rey is the large high-rise condominium building known as “The Admiralty High-Rise” or simply AHR. AHR is a large condominium complex, having three official names: Azzura condos, Regatta condos, or The Cove. AHR has a height of about 170 feet (50 m), 20 floors and can house a maximum of about 2,500 people (800 condominiums) which is almost 30% of the population of Marina del Rey. AHR is located across Admiralty Way from the harbor and has a bright green-aquamarine color. It was built in 2003. AHR, or specifically The Cove, was the main location in the 2010 film Skyline. 

The specially designed harbor has many kinds of moorings with significant cement pilings for pleasure craft and large boats, including Catalina Island multi-passenger ferry boats, a large whale watching boat as well as a pelagic seabird watching boat, commercial fishing boats, harbor cruise ships, a U.S. Coast Guard Cutter Ship, LA County Fire Department and Sheriff Department boats, and is surrounded by high-rise condos, hotels, apartments, shops, and restaurants. The area also includes the University of Southern California Information Sciences Institute, the UCLA Marina Aquatic Center, and the Loyola Marymount University boathouse.

The community is served by the  Marina Freeway (State Route 90), which links Marina del Rey directly to Interstate 405 and nearby Culver City.

The area codes of Marina del Rey are 310 and 424. Its ZIP code is 90292.

Climate

Demographics

2010
The 2010 United States Census reported that Marina del Rey had a population of 8,866, of whom 80% are White (75% Non-Hispanic White), 8% Asian, 8% Hispanic or Latino, and 5% African American. Marina del Rey had a median household income of $95,248, with 9.9% of the population living below the federal poverty line.

Arts and culture

Points of interest
California Yacht Club
Fisherman's Village
Lloyd Taber Marina del Rey Library
Pacific Mariners Yacht Club
UCLA Marina Aquatic Center

Public libraries
The County of Los Angeles Public Library operates the Lloyd Taber-Marina del Rey Library. The library has a nautical collection to serve small boaters in the area. The Abbot Kinney Memorial Branch of the Los Angeles Public Library is in Venice.

Parks and recreation
Burton Chace Park hosts community festivals such as the Marina del Rey Summer Concert Series and the Marina del Rey Holiday Boat Parade.

Yvonne B. Burke Park was renamed from the original Admiralty Park in 2009 to honor longtime Los Angeles County Supervisor Yvonne Brathwaite Burke. This linear park was built on the former Venice–Inglewood Line Pacific Electric right-of-way.

Marvin Braude Bike Trail wends through Burke Park toward Oxford Basin, which is a wildlife habitat area with a pedestrian loop. Nearby Ballona Lagoon on Marina Peninsula also has a walking loop and wildlife viewing stations. 

Aubrey E. Austin Park is a very small park.

Marina Beach, aka Mother’s Beach, has a playground on the sand.  

Area A of the Ballona Wetlands Ecological Reserve, located adjacent to Fiji Way, is accessible to the public for limited hours Wednesday through Saturday.

Marina Del Rey Wetland Park is a  park and wildlife area that is part of Ballona watershed ecosystem; the tidal salt marsh was refurbished in 2017 by L.A. County. Improvements included restoring a “degraded wetland” and installing “public walking paths, observation areas and educational signage.” The street address is 4390 Via Marina, Marina del Rey, CA 90292 at Via Marina and Tahiti Way. Public parking for visitors is available in MDR parking lot number 11 at the corner of Via Marina and Panay Way. The park is managed by Los Angeles County Department of Beaches and Harbors.

Government
Marina del Rey is managed by the Los Angeles County Department of Beaches and Harbors. All of the area's land is owned by the County of Los Angeles, which issues long-term leases.

Marina del Rey is in the Second District of the Los Angeles County Board of Supervisors, represented by Holly Mitchell.

Education
Marina del Rey is in the Los Angeles Unified School District, although there are no schools in the area proper. Students from Marina del Rey attend either Anchorage Street Elementary (now Westside Global Awareness Magnet School) or Coeur d'Alene Avenue Elementary School, Marina del Rey Middle School, and Venice High School.

Infrastructure
The Los Angeles County Sheriff's Department (LASD) has a substation in Marina del Rey. Prior to 1985, maritime and land law enforcement was provided by the Los Angeles County Harbor Patrol, a division of the Department of Small Craft Harbors. The Harbor Patrol was merged into the Sheriff's Department with sworn Harbor Patrol officers becoming Deputy Sheriffs.

The Los Angeles County Fire Department (LACFD) serves Marina del Rey and is based at Station #110, a part of Battalion 1, at 4433 Admiralty Way. The Los Angeles County Department of Health Services has an office in Marina del Rey.

Transportation
The Marina Expressway, California State Route 90, terminates at Lincoln Boulevard (California State Route 1) in northeastern Marina del Rey and links the area with Culver City. A water shuttle service, the WaterBus, operates on select days during the summer months. 

Bus shuttle services operate on the roads within the marina and between the nearby sites of Playa Vista, and the Venice Pier.

Street layout
Washington Boulevard bounds the Marina to the northwest, the Pacific Ocean to the southwest, Ballona Creek to the southeast, and Lincoln Boulevard to the northeast. Within those boundaries, Marina del Rey separates into two distinct regions, the harbor area and the suburban area.

The harbor area has eight basins separated by six strips of land, each of which has at least one street on it. From the northeastern end of the Marina, going clockwise, these streets are: Bali Way, Mindanao Way (with west terminus at Burton Chace Park), Fiji Way (bordering the southeastern edge of the Marina), Bora Bora Way, Tahiti Way, Marquesas Way, Panay Way, and Palawan Way. Panay Way, Marquesas Way, Tahiti Way, and Bora Bora Way are all on the western side of the Marina and all terminate at Via Marina, which in turn terminates at Washington Boulevard. Palawan Way is also on the west side, but it terminates directly to Washington Boulevard east of Via Marina. On the east side, Bali Way ends at Lincoln Boulevard, Fiji Way ends at the Marina Freeway and Mindanao Way turns into Short Avenue in Los Angeles after crossing Alla Road. Admiralty Way lies north of the harbor and forms an arc that intersects the roads that lead to either Washington Boulevard or Lincoln Boulevard.

The suburban area bounded by Admiralty Way to the south, Washington Boulevard to the west and Lincoln Boulevard to the east consists mostly of homes and apartments and is referred to by the real estate industry as the Golden Triangle.

Notable people
Sasha Gabor (1945–2008), actor
Lucia Berlin (1936–2004), writer

See also

 Marina del Rey (song)
 Westside (Los Angeles County)

References

External links

 
Census-designated places in Los Angeles County, California
Marinas in California
Populated coastal places in California
Ports and harbors of California
Westside (Los Angeles County)
1965 establishments in California
Populated places established in 1965
Census-designated places in California
Tourist attractions in Los Angeles County, California
Enclaves in the United States